These are the international rankings of Portugal.

Politics and Society

Economy

Education

Health

References

Portugal